The 2003 San Francisco mayoral election occurred on November 4, 2003. The incumbent, Willie Brown, was termed out of office and could not seek a third term. The general election included three top candidates including then Supervisor Gavin Newsom and then president of the board of supervisors, Matt Gonzalez and former supervisor Angela Alioto. No candidate received the required majority, so the race went into a run-off of the two top candidates, which were Gavin Newsom and Matt Gonzalez. The run-off occurred on December 9, 2003, where Gavin Newsom was elected mayor of San Francisco.

Municipal elections in California are officially non-partisan, though most candidates in San Francisco do receive funding and support from various political parties.

In 2003, then-supervisor Gavin Newsom, a Democrat, ran in a large field of challengers, including Board of Supervisors President Matt Gonzalez, Supervisor Tom Ammiano, former supervisor Angela Alioto, city treasurer Susan Leal, and former police chief Tony Ribera.  Newsom and Gonzalez took first and second place, respectively, but neither won a majority, so the two advanced to a runoff election.

Newsom ran as a moderate against leftist/progressive Gonzalez, a member of the Green Party. It was the first mayoral election in San Francisco that a Green Party candidate took a noticeable amount of the vote. The election was close, with Gonzalez leading in the polls and winning the popular vote among ballots cast on election day, while Newsom had a larger lead on absentee ballots. The strong showing of the Green Party's performance can somewhat be attributed to Peter Camejo making an rare second place finish in San Francisco County behind incumbent Democratic governor Gray Davis and ahead of Republican Bill Simon in the 2002 California gubernatorial election, a year prior.

Polling

Results

Notes

References 

San Francisco
2003
San Francisco
mayoral
Gavin Newsom